Isaac Babbitt (July 26, 1799 in Taunton, Massachusetts – May 26, 1862 in Somerville, Massachusetts) was an American inventor. In 1839, he invented a bearing made of a low-friction tin-based metal alloy, Babbitt metal, that is used extensively in engine bearings today.

Babbitt was a goldsmith by trade, who experimented with metal alloys. In 1824, he made the first Britannia metal manufactured in the United States, from which he sold table wares as Babbitt, Crossman & Company. As this proved financially unsuccessful, he withdrew, and in 1834 moved to Boston. There he engaged as superintendent for the South Boston Iron Company, better known as Alger's foundries, where he produced the first brass cannon in the United States. Also while there, in 1839, he invented the widely used metal now known as Babbitt metal, an alloy of four parts copper, eight of antimony, and twenty-four of Banca tin, used for reducing the friction of axles in heavy machinery. For this invention he received in 1841 a gold medal from the Massachusetts Charitable Mechanic Association, and afterward the United States Congress granted him $20,000. He subsequently patented this material in England (1844) and in Russia (1847). For some time, he devoted his attention to the production of the metal, and he was also engaged in the manufacture of soap.

He died in Somerville, Mass., May 26, 1862.

Patents 
 "A Mode of Making Boxes for Axles and Gudgeons", U.S. Patent 1252, July 17, 1839  
 "Metallic Hones for Sharpening Razors", U.S. Patent No. 10,5254, May 23, 1854

See also 
 Tabitha Babbitt, Shaker inventor of the circular saw.

References

 "Isaac Babbitt", Appletons Encyclopedia
 "Isaac Babbitt", Encyclopaedia Britannica

1799 births
1862 deaths
19th-century American inventors
American goldsmiths
People from Taunton, Massachusetts
Businesspeople from Massachusetts
19th-century American businesspeople
Inventors from Massachusetts